The Taylor Press is a community newspaper published in Taylor, Texas, serving East Williamson County as the legal newspaper for several communities. It has an online edition, a website and a Facebook page. The Taylor Press calls itself "the Media Gateway to East WilCo."

It was published from 1959-1974 by Frank W. Mayborn, the late publisher of the Temple Daily Telegram and the Killeen Daily Herald.

External links 
Taylor Press Online
The Hutto News online

Newspapers published in Texas